The 1904 Case football team represented the Case School of Applied Science, now a part of Case Western Reserve University, during the 1904 college football season. The team's head coach was Joseph Wentworth.  Case won its third consecutive Ohio Athletic Conference title.

Schedule

References

Case
Case Western Reserve Spartans football seasons
Case football